Jiangxi Copper is the largest copper producer in Mainland China. Its operations include copper mining, milling, smelting and refining to produce copper-related products, including pyrite concentrates, sulfuric acid and electrolytic gold and silver. Its chairman is Mr. Li Yuhuang and its headquarters is at Guixi, Jiangxi, China.

The company manufactures 340,000 tons of copper annually from its mines, which include the Dexing and Yongping pits and the Wushan, Jiangxi, underground mine.

Jiangxi Copper is also engaged in the production, processing and sale of copper cathodes, copper rods and wires and other related products. The company also provides precious metals such as gold and silver; chemical products such as sulfuric acid and sulfur ore concentrate; as well as rare metals and minerals such as molybdenum, selenium, rhenium, tellurium and bismuth.

Jiangxi Copper is also involved in the exploration and exploitation of copper, gold, silver, lead and zinc, as well as the provision of financial services.

Jiangxi Copper distributes its products in domestic markets, and exports to Hong Kong, Taiwan, Australia and Thailand, among others.

During the year 2008, Jiangxi Copper increased approximately 6.09 million metric tons of copper, 145 metric tons of gold and 1,700 metric tons of silver in reserve.

It owns a copper smelter and refinery, and its majority-owned Jiangxi Copper Products subsidiary manufactures copper rods and wires. Other operations include gold and silver production. Jiangxi Copper Company Limited was formed by parent Jiangxi Copper Corporation, which is owned by the Chinese government, in 1997. Jiangxi Copper Corporation owns 48% of Jiangxi Copper Company Limited.

Officers and directors
Ziping Long: Chairman of the Board
Zheng Gaoqing: Chief Executive Officer
Chengjiu Gan: Chief Financial Officer
Qifang Pan: General Manager, JCC Hong Kong
Dazhao Tong: Secretary of the Board (Hong Kong)
Jianmin Gao: Executive Director
Qing Liang: Executive Director
Chiwei Wang: Deputy General Manager
Jianghao Liu: Chief Engineer

References

External links 
www.jxcc.com (official website)

Companies formerly in the Hang Seng China Enterprises Index
Companies listed on the Shanghai Stock Exchange
Non-renewable resource companies established in 1979
Government-owned companies of China
Copper mining companies of China
Metal companies of China
Companies based in Jiangxi
Chinese companies established in 1979
1979 establishments in China